The Bouble is a  long river in the Allier and Puy-de-Dôme departments in south central France. Its source is at Gouttières. It flows generally northeast. It is a left tributary of the Sioule into which it flows between Saint-Pourçain-sur-Sioule and Bayet.

Departments and communes along its course
This list is ordered from source to mouth: 
 Puy-de-Dôme: Gouttières, Teilhet, Youx, Saint-Éloy-les-Mines, Moureuille, Durmignat
 Allier: Échassières
 Puy-de-Dôme: Lapeyrouse
 Allier: Louroux-de-Bouble, Vernusse, Chirat-l'Église, Target, Monestier, Bellenaves, Chantelle, Deneuille-lès-Chantelle, Fourilles, Chareil-Cintrat, Bayet, Saint-Pourçain-sur-Sioule

References

Rivers of France
Rivers of Puy-de-Dôme
Rivers of Allier
Rivers of Auvergne-Rhône-Alpes